Mohan Ranade (born Manohar Apte; 25 December 1930 – 25 June 2019), was an Indian independence activist, teacher. He participated in Goa liberation movement, and spent fourteen years in Portuguese jail for the premeditated murder of a Goan policeman named Custodio Fernandes.

Early life 
Ranade was born as Manohar Apte, on 25 December 1930 in Sangli in Maharashtra, India. He adopted the pseudonym, Mohan Ranade when he joined the Goa liberation movement.

Role in Goa liberation movement (1953–1969)
Ranade joined the militant organization, Azad Gomantak dal in 1953.As a member of the organization, he was involved in the liberation of Silvassa in 1954. When he went to Goa, he found a job as a teacher in a Marathi school for girls in the village of Savoi Verem. According to his students, Ranade was a highly motivating teacher. On Saturdays, he used to conduct student meetings to inculcate a sense of Indian nationalism, and a desire for liberation from colonial rule in them. 

Ranade also participated in a number of armed robberies on police and customs outposts, as well as mines, in order to steal weapons and explosives for his organization. On 18 August 1955, Mohan Ranade, infuriated by the action of a policeman Custodio Fernandes of Savoi Verem, for pulling down the Indian Tricolor and stamping on it, went at night to his house, called out to him and then shot him dead.

Arrest and incarceration
On 22 October 1955, Ranade attempted an armed robbery on the Betim Police Station, with an intention to loot the weapons. But Ranade was shot and wounded in his stomach by the police. Ranade was arrested, charged with various offences (armed robbery, premeditated murder, etc.), tried in Portugal and sentenced to 26 years of imprisonment.

He was incarcerated at the Caxias prison near Lisbon where he was kept in solitary confinement for the first six years. He was released in January 1969, more than seven years after the Annexation of Goa by India in December 1961, and having served almost fourteen years in prison. The intervention of the then Tamil Nadu chief minister, C. N. Annadurai, and Pope Paul VI was instrumental in securing his release.

Honours
Ranade was honoured with Padma Shri in 2001 and with the Sangli Bhushan in 2006. He was also awarded the Goa Puraskar in 1986 for his social work.

Later life and death
Ranade authored two books on the Goa Liberation Movement: Struggle Unfinished and Satiche Vaan.
He ran a charitable organisation in Pune that sponsors education of students from economically backward backgrounds. He was chairman of the Goa Red Cross for over five years. He spent his later years in the city of Pune where he died on June 25, 2019.

References 

INDIAN EXPRESS: Mohan Ranade - Struggle Unfinished Goanet listserve archive

Recipients of the Padma Shri in public affairs
1930 births
2019 deaths
Marathi people
People from Sangli
Goa liberation activists